= Minesweeping Group 50 =

Minesweeping Group 50 may refer to:

- Minesweeping Group 50 of the Royal Navy that was based at Dover, England
- Minesweeping Group 50 of the Royal Australian Navy that was based in Sydney, Australia
